
Year 728 (DCCXXVIII) was a leap year starting on Thursday (link will display the full calendar) of the Julian calendar. The denomination 728 for this year has been used since the early medieval period, when the Anno Domini calendar era became the prevalent method in Europe for naming years.

Events 
 By place 

 Europe 
 King Liutprand of the Lombards occupies all of the Exarchate of Ravenna. He advances towards Rome along the Via Cassia, and is met at the city of Sutri by Pope Gregory II, near the borders of the Duchy of Rome. Liutprand signs the Donation of Sutri, by which parts of Latium are given to the papacy (the first extension of papal territory in Italy). This marks the historical foundation of the Papal States.

Births 
 Abu Ubaidah, Muslim scholar of Arabic philology (d. 825)
 Du Huangchang, chancellor of the Tang Dynasty (or 729)

Deaths 
 Domnall mac Cellaig, king of Connacht (Ireland)
 Dúnchad mac Murchado, king of Leinster (Ireland) 
 Hasan al-Basri, Arab theologian
 Ine, king of Wessex (approximate date)
 Jarir ibn Atiyah, Arab poet and satirist

References